Sprogø is a small Danish island, located in the Great Belt, the strait that separates the main islands of Funen and Zealand.

Although sprog is modern Danish for speech, the island's name was recorded originally during the 12th century as Sproøe meaning scout's island, from the old Danish verb spro (to scout).

Today, the island is crossed by part of the Great Belt Fixed Link, a series of roads, bridges, and tunnels; it is connected to Funen by a road and rail bridge, and to Zealand by both a road suspension bridge and twin rail tunnels.

There are remains of buildings on the original part of Sprogø from the beginning of the 12th century, a fortress built by order of  King Valdemar the Great. During construction work, extensive archaeological investigations were undertaken, and among other findings it was revealed that the first inhabitants arrived more than 8,000 years ago.

The island does not have any permanent population today, but is used by Sund og Bælt, the company that owns and operates the bridges nearby. It is also a nature reserve, and tours of the island are organised.

Sprogø was a station for the semaphore line across the Belt, Storebæltstelegrafen, between Nyborg and Korsør, in operation between 1801 and 1865. Between 1923 and 1961 the island was used for containment of women deemed pathologically promiscuous, the main concern being unwanted pregnancies. At the time the practice was considered humane, given that they had been confined previously. The legacy of confinements on Sprogø inspired the fictional plot of the 2018 Danish movie thriller Journal 64.

The lighthouse, which can be seen in the picture, was built by the mail service during 1868, replacing an older structure from 1809. It was built on the foundations of the 12th-century fortress.

References

External links 
 Sund & Bælt Photo Archive: Sprogø island – construction photographs including aerial photos of Sprogø in its original form (log in using the default username and password)
 Sprogø, -øen i midten  – History of Sprogø; many images of the island
 Sprogø fyr  – about Sprogø lighthouse; many photographs.
 Sprogø - Stories from The Heritage Agency of Denmark
 Sådan tager Sprogø form på 16. år

Islands of Denmark
Geography of Slagelse Municipality